Sarah Mary Morgan KC is a British High Court Judge.

Morgan was born in Wales, the daughter of a teacher and a civil engineer. She spent some of her early childhood living  in the Caribbean before her family returned to the UK and settled in the Midlands, where she attended state schools. Morgan studied law at Brunel University, graduating in 1987.

She was called to the Bar at Gray's Inn in 1988. Morgan was appointed a Recorder sitting in the criminal and family courts on the South Eastern circuit in 2009 and was appointed a Queen’s Counsel in 2011. In 2019, she was appointed as a deputy High Court Judge.

On 11 January 2022, Morgan was appointed a judge of the Family Division of the High Court following several retirements and elevations to the Court of Appeal.

Prior to being appointed to the judiciary, Morgan practised from 1GC Family Law in London where she specialised in Family Law, particularly relating to children.

References

British women judges
High Court judges (England and Wales)
Alumni of Brunel University London
21st-century Welsh judges
21st-century King's Counsel
1960s births

Living people

Year of birth uncertain

Date of birth missing (living people)
Place of birth missing (living people)